Hrant Shahinyan (30 July 1923 – 29 May 1996), also known as Grant Shaginyan, was a Soviet Armenian gymnast. Specializing in the still rings and pommel horse, he is a two-time Olympic Champion, two-time World Champion and seven-time USSR Champion.

Shahinyan has awarded the honors Honoured Master of Sports of the USSR in 1952, Honored Coach of Armenia in 1961 and Honored Worker of Physical Culture and Sports of the Armenian SSR in 1966.

From 1967 to 1969, he headed the Sports Committee of the Armenian SSR and from 1969 to 1975 he was the Deputy Chairman of the Sports Committee.

Early life
Hrant Shahinyan was born on 30 July 1923 in the village of Gyulagarak. His family moved to Yerevan in 1930. In 1943 at the age of 20, Shahinyan volunteered to fight in the front line in World War II and received a wounded leg during service. He had to walk with a stick afterward, but after undergoing treatment in 1946 and through much hard work, was able to become a member of the USSR Artistic Gymnastic National Team.

Biography
Hrant Shahinyan began studying gymnastics under Harutyun Gargaloyana after moving to Yerevan. In 1939, he became the undisputed champion of the USSR among juniors.

As a member of the Soviet Union national team, Shahinyan competed at the 1952 Summer Olympics in Helsinki.

Shahinyan had qualified for every event. The Soviet team won the Team All-Around gold medal. Afterwards Shahinyan competed in the Individual All-Around, where he won the silver medal, coming in second to Viktor Chukarin, who would not only prove to be Shahinyan's rival, but the most decorated Olympian of the 1952 Olympics. Shahinyan was unable to best Chukarin in the pommel horse either. He tied in second with stablemate Yevgeny Korolkov, resulting in two silver medalists. Shahinyan came in fourth place in the parallel bars. When it came time for the still rings, Shahinyan scored higher than Chukarin and the rest of the participants to win the gold medal of the event and became the Olympic Champion in rings with a score of 9.950, a score which, among the men, between 1952 and 1976, seems to have been equaled or surpassed at a World Championships or Olympics only by fellow Armenian-Soviet Albert Azaryan, also on the rings, at the 1954 World Artistic Gymnastics Championships.

Two years later at the 1954 World Artistic Gymnastics Championships, Shahinyan became a World Champion in the pommel horse by winning the gold medal of the event and the Soviet team won the gold medal in the Team All-Around once again. Shahinyan also won a bronze medal in the Individual All-Around.

In 1958, Shahinyan founded the Youth Gymnastic Olympic Sports School in the Armenian capital Yerevan, and became the director of the sports school. In 1975, Shahinyan arrived in Damascus to manage the Syrian gymnastics national team for almost 5 years until 1980. Later, he returned to Armenia and lived there until his death in 1996.

Legacy
Shahinyan, who won two gold medals and two silver medals in gymnastics at the 1952 Summer Olympics in Helsinki, is the first Armenian in modern Olympic history to win an Olympic medal. To highlight the level of success of Armenians in the Olympics, Shahinyan was quoted as saying:

in 2014, Shahinyan's statue was erected at the entrance of the Hrant Shahinyan gymnastics school of Yerevan.

References

External links

Shahinyan at ArmNOC

1923 births
1996 deaths
Armenian male artistic gymnasts
Soviet male artistic gymnasts
Olympic gymnasts of the Soviet Union
Gymnasts at the 1952 Summer Olympics
Olympic gold medalists for the Soviet Union
Olympic medalists in gymnastics
Honoured Masters of Sport of the USSR
Soviet Armenians
Medalists at the 1952 Summer Olympics
Medalists at the World Artistic Gymnastics Championships
Olympic silver medalists for the Soviet Union